Certified Internal Control Auditors is a US qualification for auditors, accountants and consultants.
This certification covers auditing or monitoring internal controls or internal control systems.

See also
Certified Internal Auditor (CIA)
Internal audit

References

External links
The Institute for Internal Controls

Internal audit
Accountancy occupations